L'Équipe Champion of Champions refers to four awards presented by the daily sports newspaper L'Équipe, to female and male international sports athletes and female and male French sports athletes.

Various special awards have also been presented in the past. At the 2014 awards, former Belgian cyclist Eddy Merckx was awarded the title Legende des Sports (Championne des championnes de légende), while Danish racing driver Tom Kristensen also received an honorary award (Champion des champions d'honneur). French snowboarder Xavier de Le Rue won the 2014 award for best extreme athlete (Champion des champions de l'extrême).



International

* — 1987 award taken away after doping scandal

French

References

International winners
List of L’Équipe World Champion of Champions. Who Holds the Title (2012-10-06). Retrieved on 2014-05-24.
French winners
Loeb, Elena élus. L'Equipe (2009-12-26). Retrieved on 2014-05-24.

Sports trophies and awards
Awards established in 1946
French awards
1946 establishments in France